Huaihai may refer to:

Baizhang Huaihai (720–814), Chinese Zen master 
Huaihai Campaign, 1948–1949 military action during the Chinese Civil War
Huaihai Institute of Technology, institute in Lianyungang, Jiangsu, China
Huaihai opera, traditional Chinese theatre
Huaihai Road, street in Shanghai, China